Leslie White (born 1920 – death unknown) was an English professional rugby league footballer who played in the 1940s and 1950s. White was also a gunner in the British Army during World War II.

Playing career

International honours
Les White won caps for England while at York in 1946 against France (2 matches), and Wales (2 matches), in 1947 against France (2 matches), and Wales, while at Wigan in 1947 against Wales, in 1948 against France, and while at Halifax in 1951 against Wales, and won caps for Great Britain while at York in 1946 against Australia (3 matches), and New Zealand, and while at Wigan in 1947 against New Zealand (2 matches).

Challenge Cup Final appearances
Les White played left-, i.e. number 11, in Wigan's 8-3 victory over Bradford Northern in the 1948 Challenge Cup Final during the 1947–48 season at Wembley Stadium, London on Saturday 1 May 1948, in front of a crowd of 91,465.

County Cup Final appearances
Les White played left-, i.e. number 11, in Wigan's 10-7 victory over Belle Vue Rangers in the 1947 Lancashire County Cup Final during the 1947–48 season at Wilderspool Stadium, Warrington on Saturday 1 November 1947.

Other notable matches
Les White played right-, i.e. number 10, for Northern Command XIII against a Rugby League XIII at Thrum Hall, Halifax on Saturday 21 March 1942. Coincidentally, he played alongside another Les White.

Club career
Les White was transferred from York to Wigan, he made his dêbut for Wigan in the 39-5 victory over Liverpool Stanley at Central Park, Wigan on Saturday 23 August 1947, he scored his first try for Wigan in the 39-5 victory over Liverpool Stanley at Central Park, Wigan on Saturday 23 August 1947, he scored his last try for Wigan in the 26-7 victory over Warrington at Central Park, Wigan on 9 April 1949, he played his last match for Wigan in the 29-18 victory over Batley at Mount Pleasant, Batley on 20 August 1949, he was transferred from Wigan to Halifax.

References

External links
Search for "Leslie White" at britishnewspaperarchive.co.uk
Search for "Les White" at britishnewspaperarchive.co.uk

1920 births
British Army personnel of World War II
England national rugby league team players
English rugby league players
Great Britain national rugby league team players
Halifax R.L.F.C. players
Northern Command XIII rugby league team players
Place of birth missing
Place of death missing
Royal Artillery soldiers
Rugby league props
Rugby league second-rows
Wigan Warriors players
Year of death missing
York Wasps players
Yorkshire rugby league team players